Entgen Luijten (1600-1674), was a Dutch woman who was accused of witchcraft.

She was prosecuted for witchcraft in Limbricht. She was subjected to torture during interrogation in prison. She died in prison of unknown causes. She is known as the last person prosecuted for witchcraft in the territory of The Netherlands.

She is the main character of the novel De heks van Limbricht (2021) by Susan Smit.

A statue of Entgen Luijten, made by Ankie Vrolings-Bleilebens, was erected on 3 June 2022 on Kasteel Limbricht.

References

1674 deaths
Witch trials in the Netherlands
17th-century Dutch women
People accused of witchcraft
1600 births